Manasi Joshi Roy is an Indian film and television actress known for her roles in Saaya, Gharwali Uparwali and Kkusum. She is the wife of actor Rohit Roy, sister of actor Sharman Joshi and daughter of Gujarati theatre actor Arvind Joshi.

Early and personal life
Joshi has a bachelor's degree in psychology from Mithibai College (Mumbai). She is the daughter of Gujarati theatre actor, director and producer Arvind Joshi, and actor Sharman Joshi is her brother. Actor Pravin Joshi was her uncle and actress Sarita Joshi is her aunt. Actresses Ketaki Dave, Purbi Joshi and Poonam Joshi are her cousins.

Joshi married actor Rohit Roy on 23 June 1999. They have a daughter, Kiara.

Filmography

Television

References

External links 
 
 
 

Living people
Indian television actresses
Actresses in Hindi television
Mithibai College alumni
Gujarati people
Year of birth missing (living people)